Sister Dynamite is the third solo album by Alice Bag. The album was released on In the Red.

The single "Spark" was released in early April. Bag described the song as "about owning the differences that other people might see as odd or queer and celebrating them because they are what makes you unique. It’s a song about self-acceptance and self-love."

Track listing
"Spark"
"Gate Crasher"
"Switch Hitter"
"Identified"
"Sender Is Blocked"
"Breadcrumbs"
"Súbele"
"Noise"
"Sister Dynamite"
"Lucky"
"Even"
"Risk It"

Personnel
Alice Bag – vocals
David Jones – bass
Sharif Dumani – guitar
Candace PK Hansen – drums

Reception
Punknews.org praised the album saying the songs had "an expertly crafted mix of '70's rock and punk rock backbone." AllMusic called the album Bag's "third out-of-the-park home run in a row." Atwood Magazine said the album was "a life affirming, head banging experience."

References

External links
Alice Bag on Bandcamp

2020 albums
Alice Bag albums
In the Red Records albums